Solomons Store is a small unincorporated community in Henrico County, located where Telegraph Road and Mountain Road fork off of U.S. Route 1.

References

Unincorporated communities in Virginia